The estipite column is a type of pilaster typical of the Churrigueresque Baroque style of Spain and Spanish America used in the 18th century. In the late Baroque period, many classical architectural elements lost their simple shapes and became increasingly complex, offering variety of forms and exuberant decoration.  Therefore, the column has the shape of an inverted cone or obelisk. The shaft is always wider in its middle part than the base and capital. The column combines features of both late Baroque and Mannerist.  It was widely used between 1720 and 1780.

Characteristics

Form 
The shape of the estipite has a narrow base and the shaft is in the shape of an inverted obelisk. This is a variation to previous uses of the pilaster which deviates from classical architecture with its form. In classical architecture, pilasters give the impression that they have a load bearing function. However, due to the obelisk shape of the estipite, this tradition is disrupted. The estipite is not supposed to look solid, instead be dynamic and create movement. Creating an apparent lightness to the structure.

Manuel Toussaint defines estipites as:

“A supporting member, square or rectangular in section, and formed of multiple elements: pyramids and truncated prisms, parallelepipeds, superimposed foliage, medallions, garlands, bouquets, festoons. The ornament is all vegetable, applied to geometric forms”.

Capitals 
The capitals usually highlight the line of a broken cornice and are unabridged. Or may be connected to another estipite by a horizontal entablature. The capital for esiplite pilasters are typically Corinthian. There are deviations to this. For example, decorations of vegetation and cherub heads take the place of the Corinthian capital in Capilla del Sagrario for the Cathedral of Segovia by Jeronimo de Balbas.

Double Columns 
Similar to Baroque styling with the use of double columns, the double estipites is a feature in some Churrigueresque buildings.

Alongside other styles 
Estipies were utilized between Ultra-Baroque and the rise of Neo-Classical styles. Therefore, even though estipites are distinct in style, they are sometimes used alongside Solomonic and classical columns. A good example of this is San Francisco Acatepec in Puebla.

History

Origin 
In Richard W. Amero's thesis, The California Building: A Case Of The Misunderstood Baroque, he claims that Michelangelo is the first one to use an estipite pilaster in the Laurentian Library (1526). Meanwhile, John F Moffitt states in his thesis El Sagrario Metropolitano, Wendel Dietterlin, and The Estipite that Juan de Arfe y Villafane could have been the first known person to mention the estipite. This is seen in Arfe's,  Description de la traza de la custodia de la Iglesia de Sevilla (1587). Therefore, the origins of the estipite are debated among scholars.

Spain and New Spain 
The architect known for making estipites popular is Jose Benito de Churriguera, who has the Churrigueresque style named after him. His first works with estipites were Capilla del Sagrario for the Segovia Cathedral (1690) and Convento de San Esteban, Salamanca (1693). Jeronimo de Balbas was a Spanish architect who moved to Mexico (New Spain) in 1717, and introduced the new world to estipites. His work Retablo de los Reyes in the Mexico City Metropolitan Cathedral (1718–37)  was the first building to showcase estipites in the New World. The era of estipites only lasted till 1783 with the establishment of Academia de San Carlos, an architecture school in New Spain. However, in this short period of time 1736, the completion of Retablo de los Reyes, till 1783, many buildings in New Spain (Mexico) had facades or alters with estipites. Due to the decline in popularity for the estipite pilasters, Solomonic and Classical columns were revived throughout Spain and New Spain. This led to many estipite-style monuments to be destroyed or replaced with classical columns in the last decades of the 1800s.

Buildings 
Small list of buildings that estipites are a design feature for.

References 

Baroque architectural features
Churrigueresque architecture
Orders of columns
Columns and entablature